Malik Fiaz Ahmad Awan is a Pakistani politician who was a Member of the Provincial Assembly of the Punjab, from 2008 to May 2018. He was also an agriculturist.

Early life and education
Awan was born on 6 September 1960 in Hafizabad.

He has the degree of Bachelor of Arts.

Political career
Awan ran for the seat of the Provincial Assembly of the Punjab as an independent candidate from Constituency PP-79 (Gujranwala-III) in 1990 Pakistani general election but was unsuccessful. He received 11,625 votes and lost the seat to Noor Muhammad, a candidate of Islami Jamhoori Ittehad (IJI).

He ran for the seat of the Provincial Assembly of the Punjab as an independent candidate from Constituency PP-79 (Hafizabad-I) in 1993 Pakistani general election but was unsuccessful. He received 5,848 votes and lost the seat to Syed Muhammad Arif Hussain, a candidate of Pakistan Muslim League (N) (PML-N).

He ran for the seat of the Provincial Assembly of the Punjab as a candidate of Pakistan Peoples Party (PPP) from Constituency PP-105 (Hafizabad-I) in 2002 Pakistani general election, but was unsuccessful. He received 24,638 votes and lost the seat to Muzaffar Ali Sheikh, a candidate of Pakistan Muslim League (Q) (PML-Q).

He was elected to the Provincial Assembly of the Punjab as a candidate of PPP from Constituency PP-105 (Hafizabad-I) in 2008 Pakistani general election. He received 34,134 votes and defeated Haji Rai Riasat Ali, a candidate of PML-Q.

He was re-elected to the Provincial Assembly of the Punjab as a candidate of PML-N from Constituency PP-105 (Hafizabad-I) in 2013 Pakistani general election. He received 55,021 votes and defeated an independent candidate, Muzaffar Ali Sheikh.

References

Living people
Punjab MPAs 2013–2018
1960 births
Pakistan Muslim League (N) politicians
Punjab MPAs 2008–2013